The Bosnia and Herzegovina women's national rugby union team are a national sporting side of Bosnia and Herzegovina, representing them at rugby union. The side played their first test match against Norway at the 2005 European Championship. They are currently 44th in World Rugby's ranking.

Results summary
(Full internationals only)

Results

Full internationals

See also
 Rugby union in Bosnia and Herzegovina

External links
 
 Bosnia and Herzegovina on World Rugby
 Bosnia and Herzegovina  on rugbydata.com

European national women's rugby union teams
Women's national rugby union teams
National women's team
Rugby union